Marquis Cheng of Jin (Ancestral name is Ji (姬), given name is Furen (服人), was the fourth ruler of the state of Jin during the Western Zhou Dynasty. He succeeded his father, Marquis Wu of Jin, and was succeeded by his son Marquis Li of Jin.

References

Monarchs of Jin (Chinese state)
9th-century BC Chinese monarchs